The Primrose Path is a 1925 American silent drama film directed by Harry O. Hoyt and starring Wallace MacDonald, Clara Bow and Arline Pretty.

Plot summary

Cast
 Wallace MacDonald as Bruce Armstrong 
 Clara Bow as Marilyn Merrill 
 Arline Pretty as Helen 
 Stuart Holmes as Tom Canfield 
 Pat Moore as Jimmy Armstrong 
 Tom Santschi as Big Joe Snead 
 Lydia Knott as Mrs. Armstrong 
 Templar Saxe as Dude Talbot 
 Mike Donlin as Federal Officer Parker 
 Henry Hall as Court Officer
 George Irving as Prosecutor John Morton

Plot
Bruce Armstrong, a young man with a history of drinking and gambling ills, agrees to be part of a diamond-smuggling operation in order to pay off his debts to Tom Canfield, a corrupt Broadway producer.  Armstrong completes his task, but he kills another conspirator, Big Joe Snead, in a fight after the diamonds are taken by a third conspirator, Dude Talbot.  Shortly before Armstrong is to die in the electric chair, Talbot confesses to the police that he had pilfered the diamonds, that Snead was a ruthless killer, and that Armstrong certainly killed Snead in self-defense.

References

Bibliography
 Munden, Kenneth White. The American Film Institute Catalog of Motion Pictures Produced in the United States, Part 1. University of California Press, 1997.

External links
 
 
 
 

1925 films
1925 drama films
Silent American drama films
Films directed by Harry O. Hoyt
American silent feature films
1920s English-language films
American black-and-white films
Arrow Film Corporation films
1920s American films